"Circle" is the third single from Marques Houston's third album Veteran. It reached #78 on the Billboard Hot 100.

External links
"Circle" Music Video

2007 singles
Marques Houston songs
Songs written by Adonis Shropshire
Songs written by Bryan-Michael Cox
Songs written by Kendrick Dean
2007 songs
Universal Records singles
The Ultimate Group singles
Songs written by Marques Houston